The 1982 United States Senate election in Minnesota was held on November 2, 1982. Incumbent Republican U.S. Senator David Durenberger was reelected to his first full term.

Democratic–Farmer–Labor primary

Candidates 
 William A. Branstner
 Mark Dayton, businessman
 Eugene McCarthy, former U.S. Senator
 Charles E. Pearson

Results

Independent-Republican primary

Candidate 
David Durenberger, incumbent U.S. Senator
 Mary Jane Rachner

Results

General election

Campaign 
Dayton, 35, self-financed his campaign. Married to a Rockefeller and heir to a department store, his net worth was an estimated $30 million. Durenberger won the special election to finish the term of the late Hubert Humphrey. He was considered a moderate, but supported Reagan's tax cuts. Dayton ran against Reaganomics. He has also campaigned against tax breaks for the wealthy and even promised "to close tax loopholes for the rich and the corporations—and if you think that includes the Daytons, you're right." Dayton spent over $7 million, Durenberger over $4 million.

Results

See also 
 1982 United States Senate elections

References 

1982 Minnesota elections
Minnesota
1982